Roland Thomas was  Dean of Bangor from 1570 until 1588.

References

16th-century Welsh Anglican priests
Deans of Bangor